Arrilalah is a ghost town in the locality of Longreach in the Longreach Region of Western Queensland, Australia.

History 
The site was originally settled in the 1860s with the name "Forest Grove", but the name was changed to Arrilalah, a word with an uncertain origin, in 1885.  The town began a long decline when the railway bypassed it, instead connecting to the nearby town of Longreach.

Arrilalah Provisional School opened circa 1889 and closed in 1906 due to low attendances.

By the 1980s, there were no permanent inhabitants remaining.  The local cemetery was rededicated in 2010, and was the site of approximately forty burials.

References

Longreach Region
Ghost towns in Queensland